The list shown below is showing the archers who will be competing at the 2020 Summer Olympics in Tokyo, Japan. The archers are to play a set of 5 events: Men's Individual, Team; Womens Individual, Team; and the Mixed Team

Male Archers

Female Archers

References

Lists of archers
list
Lists of competitors at the 2020 Summer Olympics